İmambekirli is a village in Silifke district of Mersin Province, Turkey. . It is situated on Taurus Mountains  to the west of Göksu River valley. The population of the village was 343 as of 2014. Main economic activities are agriculture and animal breeding. Main crops are olive, apricot, plum, figs, and pistachio.

References

Villages in Silifke District